The Aßberg is a 703-m high mountain located in the Thuringian Highland region of Thuringia, Germany.

It is located close to the municipalities of Deesbach, Meura, Reichmannsdorf, and Schmiedefeld and the Leibis-Lichte Dam in the Saalfeld-Rudolstadt district in the Thuringian Forest Nature Park.

See also
 List of Mountains and Elevations of Thuringia

Mountains of Thuringia
Saalfeld-Rudolstadt